The South American sea nettle (Chrysaora plocamia) is a species of jellyfish from the family Pelagiidae. It is found from the Pacific coast of Peru, south along Chile's coast to Tierra del Fuego, and north along the Atlantic coast of Argentina, with a few records from Uruguay. Despite its common name, it is not the only sea nettle in South America; C. lactea ranges along the Atlantic coast of the continent, but generally further north than C. plocamia. Historically, C. plocamia was often confused with C. hysoscella, a species now known to be restricted to the northeast Atlantic.

Reproduction 
The South American sea nettle is highly evolved, specifically within their sexual reproductive strategies. They have to undergo bodily changes in order to experience both sexual and asexual reproduction then go through a process called strobilation.

References

Chrysaora
Animals described in 1830